Morris Ankrum (born Morris Nussbaum; August 28, 1897 – September 2, 1964) was an American radio, television, and film character actor.

Early life
Born in Danville in Vermilion County in eastern Illinois, Ankrum originally began a career in academics. After graduating from The University of Southern California with a law degree, he went on to an associate professorship in economics at the University of California, Berkeley. While at Berkeley he became involved in the drama department and eventually began teaching drama and directing at the Pasadena Playhouse.

From 1923 to 1939 he acted in several Broadway stage productions, including Gods of the Lightning, The Big Blow, and Within the Gates.

Film career
Before signing with Paramount Pictures in the 1930s, Nussbaum had already changed his last name to Ankrum. Upon signing with the studio, he chose to use the name "Stephen Morris" before changing it to Morris Ankrum in 1939.

Ankrum was cast in supporting roles as stalwart authority figures, including scientists, military men (particularly army officers), judges, trail hands, bankers, and even psychiatrists in more than 270 films and television episodes. His parts included villainous roles in Paramount's Hopalong Cassidy film series. Ankrum was in Metro-Goldwyn-Mayer's production of Tennessee Johnson (1942), a biographical film about Andrew Johnson, the 17th U.S. president. As Sen. Jefferson Davis, Ankrum addresses the United States Senate upon his resignation to lead the Confederate States of America as that republic's first—and only—president. Ankrum's film career spanned 30 years. His credits were largely concentrated in the western and science-fiction genres.

Ankrum appeared in such westerns as Ride 'Em Cowboy in 1942, Vera Cruz opposite Gary Cooper and Burt Lancaster, Apache (1954), and Cattle Queen of Montana with Barbara Stanwyck and Ronald Reagan.

In the science fiction genre, he appeared in Rocketship X-M (1950); as a Martian leader in Flight to Mars (1951); in Red Planet Mars (1952), playing the United States Secretary of Defense; in the cult classic Invaders From Mars (1953), playing a United States Army general; and as another Army general in Earth vs. the Flying Saucers (1956); as a psychiatrist in the cult classic Kronos (1957); and other military-officer roles in Beginning of the End (1957) and The Giant Claw (1957).

Later years
By the end of 1958 Ankrum's film career had essentially ended, though he continued taking television roles. In the syndicated series Stories of the Century Ankrum played outlaw Chris Evans, who with his young associate John Sontag, played by John Smith, turned to crime to thwart the Southern Pacific Railroad, which Evans and Sontag held in contempt.

Ankrum made 22 appearances on CBS's Perry Mason as one of several judges who regularly presided over the murder trials of Mason's clients from the show's first season in 1957 until his death in 1964. The show ended two years later.

Ankrum appeared in western series such as The Adventures of Rin Tin Tin, Bronco, Maverick, Tales of the Texas Rangers, Cimarron City, Rawhide and The Rifleman.

Ankrum appeared in a number of ABC/Warner Brothers westerns. On October 15, 1957, he had a major part in the episode "Strange Land" of the series Sugarfoot, starring Will Hutchins. Ankrum played an embittered rancher named Cash Billings, who allows hired gunman Burr Fulton ( Rhodes Reason) to take over his spread, but Sugarfoot arrives to bring law and justice to the situation. Ankrum appeared again, as John Savage, in 1959 in the Sugarfoot episode "The Wild Bunch". The same year, he portrayed a zealot who abused his daughter, played by Sherry Jackson, in the episode "The Naked Gallows" of the western Maverick with Jack Kelly and Mike Connors. In 1961, he again played embittered, and this time paralyzed, rancher Cyrus Dawson in the episode "Incident at Dawson Flats" of the western series Cheyenne.

In the 1958–59 season Ankrum appeared 12 times in Richard Carlson's syndicated western series Mackenzie's Raiders. In the series set on the Rio Grande border, Carlson plays Col. Ranald Mackenzie, who faces troubles from assorted border outlaws.
 
Ankrum was cast in an episode of the 1959 CBS sitcom Dennis the Menace. He also made occasional uncredited appearances in several Roger Corman films. While busy in films and television, Ankrum was still involved in live theatre and continued to direct plays at the Pasadena Playhouse.

He and his second wife, Joan Wheeler (married aka Joan Ankrum), had a child, David Ankrum, best known as Adam from Tabitha. David Ankrum eventually became a Hollywood agent. Joan Ankrum, of Joan Ankrum Galleries, became a prominent Los Angeles art dealer with a gallery on La Cienega Boulevard

Death
On September 2, 1964, Ankrum died of trichinosis. At the time of his death, he was still involved with Raymond Burr's Perry Mason TV series. His final appearance on Perry Mason, in the episode "The Case of the Sleepy Slayer", and his last feature film, Guns of Diablo, in which he was cast as Ray Macklin, were released in 1964 and 1965, respectively, following Ankrum's death.

Ankrum is interred at Spring Hill Cemetery in Danville, Illinois.

Selected filmography

Reunion in Vienna (1933) as Musician (uncredited)
Stand Up and Cheer! (1934) as Washington Press Correspondent (uncredited)
The Return of Hopalong Cassidy (1936) as Blackie
Trail Dust (1936) as Tex Anderson
Borderland (1937) as Loco
Hills of Old Wyoming (1937) as Andrews 
North of the Rio Grande (1937) as Henry Stoneham
Rustlers' Valley (1937) as Glen Randall 
Knights of the Range (1940) as Gamecock
The Showdown (1940) as Baron Rendor
Light of the Western Stars (1940) as Nat Hayworth
Buck Benny Rides Again (1940) as Second Outlaw
Cherokee Strip (1940) as Hawk Barrett
Three Men from Texas (1940) as Bruce Morgan
Doomed Caravan (1941) as Stephen Westcott
Cheers for Miss Bishop (1941) as Professor at Minna's Hearing (uncredited)
The Roundup (1941) as 'Parenthesis'
In Old Colorado (1941) as Joe Weiler
Border Vigilantes (1941) as Dan Forbes
Pirates on Horseback (1941) as Ace Gibson
Wide Open Town (1941) as Jim Stuart
This Woman Is Mine (1941) as Roussel
The Bandit Trail (1941) as Red Haggerty
I Wake Up Screaming (1941) as Assistant District Attorney
Road Agent (1941) as Big John Morgan
Ride 'Em Cowboy (1942) as Ace Anderson
Roxie Hart (1942) as Martin S. Harrison
Ten Gentlemen from West Point (1942) as Wood
Tales of Manhattan (1942) as Judge Tom Barnes (Robinson sequence)
The Loves of Edgar Allan Poe (1942) as Mr. Graham
The Omaha Trail (1942) as Henchman Job
Tennessee Johnson (1942) as Jefferson Davis
Time to Kill (1942) as Alexander Morny
Reunion in France (1942) as Martin
The Human Comedy (1943) as Mr. Beaufrere (uncredited)
Assignment in Brittany (1943) as Stenger (uncredited)
Dixie Dugan (1943) as Editor
Best Foot Forward (1943) as Col. Harkrider
Let's Face It (1943) as Man in Sun Shell Cafe (uncredited)
I Dood It (1943) as Brinker
Swing Fever (1943) as Dan Conlon
The Cross of Lorraine (1943) as Col. Demas (uncredited)
Whistling in Brooklyn (1943) as Blake - Newspaper Editor (uncredited)
See Here, Private Hargrove (1944) as Col. Forbes (uncredited)
The Heavenly Body (1944) as Dr. Green
Rationing (1944) as Mr. Morgan
Main Street Today (1944, Short) as Mayor Charlie Maxwell (uncredited)
Radio Bugs (1944, Short) as Pain-Killer Kilroy, the dentist (uncredited)
Important Business (1944, Short) as Army Officer Who Sits by Doakes (uncredited)
And Now Tomorrow (1944)
Meet the People (1944) as Monte Rowland
Kismet (1944) as The Caliph's Messenger (uncredited)
Marriage Is a Private Affair (1944) as Mr. Ed Scofield
Barbary Coast Gent (1944) as Alec Veeder
Return from Nowhere (1944, Short) as Doctor (uncredited)
Thirty Seconds over Tokyo (1944) as Admiral William F. Halsey (uncredited)
Gentle Annie (1944) as Deputy Gansby
Dark Shadows (1944, Short) as Police Lt. Pat McKay
Fall Guy (1945, Short) as District Attorney (uncredited)
Phantoms, Inc. (1945, Short) Narrator (uncredited voice)
The Hidden Eye (1945) as Ferris
Purity Squad (1945, Short) as Dr. Adams (uncredited)
Adventure (1945) as Mr. Ludlow - Farmer (uncredited)
The Thin Man Goes Home (1945) as Willoughby
The Harvey Girls (1946) as Rev. Claggett
The Postman Always Rings Twice (1946) as Judge Parkman (uncredited)
The Green Years (1946) as Dr. Galbraith (uncredited)
Courage of Lassie (1946) as Farmer Crews
The Cockeyed Miracle (1946) as Dr. Wilson
Undercurrent (1946) (uncredited)
Lady in the Lake (1947) as Eugene Grayson
The Mighty McGurk (1947) as Fowles
A Really Important Person (1947, Short) as Contest Emcee (uncredited)
The Sea of Grass (1947) as A.J. Crane, Attorney
Undercover Maisie (1947) as Parker (scenes cut)
Little Mr. Jim (1947) as Col. Starwell
Song of the Thin Man (1947) as The Police Inspector (uncredited)
Cynthia (1947) as Mr. Phillips, the High-School Principal
Merton of the Movies (1947) as Goodfellow's Club Manager (uncredited)
Desire Me (1947) as Hector Martin
Good News (1947) as Dean Griswold
High Wall (1947) as Dr. Stanley Griffin
Alias a Gentleman (1948) as O.K. (scenes cut)
Souvenirs of Death (1948, Short) as Gangster / Gun Owner #7 (uncredited)
Fighting Back (1948) as Robert J. Higby
The Fabulous Fraud (1948, Short) as Blind Girl's Father
For the Love of Mary (1948) as Adm. Walton
Joan of Arc (1948) as Capt. Poton de Xaintrailles
Bad Men of Tombstone (1949) as Mr. Jones
We Were Strangers (1949) as Mr. Seymour
Colorado Territory (1949) as United States Marshal
The Fountainhead (1949) as Prosecutor (uncredited)
Slattery's Hurricane (1949) as Dr. Holmes (uncredited)
Chain Lightning (1950) as Ed Bostwick
Borderline (1950) as Bill Whittaker
The Damned Don't Cry! (1950) as Jim Whitehead
In a Lonely Place (1950) as Lloyd Barnes
Rocketship X-M (1950) as Dr. Ralph Fleming
Southside 1-1000 (1950) as Eugene Deane
Short Grass (1950) as Hal Fenton
The Redhead and the Cowboy (1951) as Sheriff
The Lion Hunters (1951) as Tom Forbes
Fighting Coast Guard (1951) as Navy Captain
Along the Great Divide (1951) as Ed Roden
Tomorrow Is Another Day (1951) as Hugh Wagner
Flight to Mars (1951) as Ikron
My Favorite Spy (1951) as Gen. Frazer
Fort Osage (1952) as Arthur Pickett
Mutiny (1952) as Capt. Radford
Red Planet Mars (1952) as Secretary of Defense Sparks
And Now Tomorrow (1952)
Three for Bedroom "C" (1952) as Well-Wisher at Station (uncredited)
Son of Ali Baba (1952) as Ali Baba
The Raiders (1952) as Alcalde Thomas Ainsworth
Because of You (1952) as Dr. Travis
Hiawatha (1952) as Iagoo
The Man Behind the Gun (1953) as Bram Creegan
Fort Vengeance (1953) as Chief Crowfoot
I Beheld His Glory (1953, TV Movie) as Simon Peter
Invaders From Mars (1953) as Col. Fielding
Arena (1953) as Bucky Hillberry
Devil's Canyon (1953) as Sheriff
Sky Commando (1953) as Gen. W.R. Combs
Mexican Manhunt (1953) as Tip Morgan
The Moonlighter (1953) as Alexander Prince
Flight Nurse (1953) as Interrogating Officer (uncredited)
Three Young Texans (1954) as Jeff Blair
Taza, Son of Cochise (1954) as Grey Eagle
Southwest Passage (1954) as Dr. Elias P. Stanton
Drums Across the River (1954) as Chief Ouray
The Saracen Blade (1954)
Silver Lode (1954) as Zachary Evans
Apache (1954) as Dawson
The Outlaw Stallion (1954) as Sheriff
Two Guns and a Badge (1954) as Sheriff Jackson
Cattle Queen of Montana (1954) as J.I. 'Pop' Jones
The Steel Cage (1954) as Prison Board Member Garvey (segment "The Hostages")
Vera Cruz (1954) as Gen. Ramírez
For the Defense (1954, TV Movie) as Prosecutor
The Little Lamb: A Christmas Story (1955, Short) as Azar the Shepherd (uncredited)
Dr. Harvey W. Wiley (1955, TV Movie) as Dr. Treet
Many Rivers to Cross (1955) as Mr. Emmett - Surly Innkeeper & J.P. (uncredited)
Crashout (1955) as Head Guard
The Silver Star (1955) as Charlie Childress
Chief Crazy Horse (1955) as Red Cloud
The Eternal Sea (1955) as Vice-Adm. Arthur Dewey Struble
No Man's Woman (1955) as Capt. Hostedder
The Last Command (1955) as Military Governor Juan Bradburn (uncredited)
Duel on the Mississippi (1955) as Magistrate (uncredited)
Tennessee's Partner (1955) as Judge Parker
The Adventures of Fu Manchu (1956) as Professor Rutledge
Fury at Gunsight Pass (1956) as Doc Phillips
When Gangland Strikes (1956) as Leo Fantzler
Quincannon, Frontier Scout (1956) as Col. Harry Conover
Earth vs. the Flying Saucers (1956) as Brig. Gen. John Hanley
Down Liberty Road (1956, Short) as Fred Schroder
Walk the Proud Land (1956) as Gen. Wade
Death of a Scoundrel (1956) as Capt. LaFarge - Homicide Squad
The Desperadoes Are in Town (1956) as Mr. Rutherford
Naked Gun (1956) as Sheriff Jim Jackson
Drango (1957) as Henry Calder
Zombies of Mora Tau(1957) as Dr. Jonathan Eggert
Hell's Crossroads (1957) as Wheeler
Kronos (1957) as Dr. Albert Stern
The Giant Claw (1957) as Lt. Gen. Edward Considine
Beginning of the End (1957) as Gen. John Hanson
Omar Khayyam (1957) as Imam Nowaffak
The Power of the Resurrection (1958) as Annas
Giant from the Unknown (1958) as Dr. Frederick Cleveland
Young and Wild (1958) as Police Capt. Egan
How to Make a Monster (1958) as Police Capt. Hancock
Curse of the Faceless Man (1958) as Narrator (voice, uncredited)
Badman's Country (1958) as Mayor Coleman
Twilight for the Gods (1958) as Sea Captain
The Saga of Hemp Brown (1958) as Bo Slauter
Tarawa Beachhead (1958) as Chief of Staff, Pearl Harbor (uncredited)
From the Earth to the Moon (1958) as President Ulysses S. Grant (uncredited)
Frontier Gun (1958) as Andrew Barton
Half Human (1958) as Dr. Carl Jordan
The Little Shepherd of Kingdom Come (1961) as Gen. Lew Wallace (uncredited)
The Most Dangerous Man Alive (1961) as Capt. Davis
Tower of London (1962) as The Archbishop (uncredited)
X: The Man with the X-ray Eyes (1963) as Mr. Bowhead (uncredited)
Guns of Diablo (1965) as Ray Macklin (final film role)

Television credits

Amos 'n' Andy  (1 episode, 1951) as Judge
Cowboy G-Men (3 episodes, 1953) as John Calhoun / Judge Jefferson Dixon / Carl Randall
The Pepsi-Cola Playhouse (1 episode, 1953) as Tom
The Life and Legend of Wyatt Earp (1 episode, 1955) as Old Man Cullen
Schlitz Playhouse of Stars (3 episodes, 1953–1955) as Link Bradford / Hendrick Vandorp / Damon Norton / Mark Warren
Four Star Playhouse (3 episodes, 1955–1956) as Mr. Raymond / Mr. Mason / Warden
Cavalcade of America (2 episodes, 1953–1956) as Peter Slade / Maj. Gen. C. H. Gerhardt / Gen. Stonewall Jackson
Science Fiction Theatre (4 episodes, 1955–1956) as Dr. McDermott / Campbell / Dr. Clausen / George Halsey
You Are There (1 episode, 1956) as Daniel Webster
Official Detective TV series episode 'Beauty In The Bag' (1957) as Cope
The Adventures of Jim Bowie (1 episode, 1957) as John McDonogh / Gabriel Durand
Lassie (1 episode, 1957) as Harry
Tombstone Territory (2 episodes, 1957 and 1959) as George West / Galeno Mayor
Sugarfoot (2 episodes, 1957 and 1959) as John Savage / Cash Billings
Maverick (2 episodes, 1957 and 1960) as Judge Jason Painter / Joshua Haines
Tales of Wells Fargo (1 episodes, 1957) as Colonel Cole Bryson 
The Veil (1 episode, 1958) as Judge Davis
Have Gun - Will Travel (1 episode, 1958) as Maxim Bruckner
U.S. Marshal (in "Good Indian", 1958) as Henry Colt 
Mackenzie's Raiders (2 episodes, 1958-1959) as Dutch Herman / Sergeant Lund
Sea Hunt (1 episode, 1958) as Earl Tucker - Head of INS
26 Men (2 episodes, 1958) as Jeff Hubbard / Miles Young
The Adventures of Rin Tin Tin (6 episodes, 1955–1958) as Yellow Wolf / Brig. General Jack Lawrence / Chief Red Eagle / Walking Hawk / Long Dog / Millard Austin
Wagon Train (as Michael Folsom in "The Tobias Jones Story", 1958) as Michael Folsom

Frontier Doctor (1 episode, 1959) as Colonel Martin Brandt
Death Valley Days (in "A Bullet for the Captain", 1958) as Major Rogers and (in "The Talking Wire", 1959) as Phillips
Lawman (in "The Young Toughs", 1959) as Ike Smith
Bat Masterson (in "A Matter of Honor", 1959) as Judge Dorset 
Markham (in "The Last Bullet", 1959) as Harold Burgess
Tombstone Territory (2 episodes, 1957–1959) as George West / Galeno Mayor
Riverboat (in "A Night at Trapper's Landing, 1959) as C.C. Thompson
Gunsmoke (as Merle in "The Bobsy Twins", 1960) as Merle Finney
Dennis the Menace (1 episode, 1960) as Minister
The Man from Blackhawk (1 episode, as Martin Randolph in "Portrait of Cynthia", 1960) as Martin Randolph
Cheyene (4 episodes, 1956–1961) as Cyrus Dawson / Matt Benedict / John Clements / Ed Roden, Sr.
Rawhide (2 episodes, 1959–1961) as Dr. Morgan / Dr. Tom Jackson
The Rifleman (2 episodes, 1959–1961) as Jacob Black / Aaron Pelser
Bronco (5 episodes, 1958–1961) as Gilbert Groves / General Blunt / Dan Peppin / Gen. George Meade / Todd Morgan
The Barbara Stanwyck Show (as Walter Harwood in "Along the Barbary Coast, 1961)
Bonanza (as Mr. Mason in "The Gamble", 1962) as Mr. Mason
Kraft Suspense Theatre (1 episode, 1964) as Chief Austin
Perry Mason (22 episodes, 1957–1964) as Judge / Judge Bates

References

External links

1896 births
1964 deaths
American male stage actors
American male film actors
American male radio actors
American male television actors
Male actors from Illinois
USC Gould School of Law alumni
University of California, Berkeley College of Letters and Science faculty
California lawyers
People from Danville, Illinois
Male actors from Berkeley, California
Male actors from Los Angeles
20th-century American male actors
Male Western (genre) film actors
20th-century American lawyers
Western (genre) television actors